Roberts Massif is a remarkable snow-free massif at the head of Shackleton Glacier. It was visited by the Southern Party of the New Zealand Geological Survey Antarctic Expedition (NZGSAE) (1961–62), who named it for A.R. Roberts, leader at Scott Base for 1961–62.

Mountains of the Ross Dependency
Dufek Coast